Kinky Boots is a musical that opened on Broadway in 2013, winning the Tony Award for Best Musical and various other awards that season.  The show has a book by Harvey Fierstein and songs by Cyndi Lauper.  Kinky Boots is based on the 2005 British film of the same name, which was, in turn, inspired by a true story.

The original production was directed and choreographed by Jerry Mitchell and orchestrated by Stephen Oremus.  Scenic design was by David Rockwell, costumes by Gregg Barnes, lighting by Kenneth Posner and sound by John Shivers.  The cast starred Billy Porter as Lola and Stark Sands as Charlie and featured Annaleigh Ashford as Lauren.

Early in the 2013 awards season, Kinky Boots did well, receiving Drama League Award nominations for Distinguished Production of a Musical and Distinguished Performance, for both Porter and Sands, and winning for Distinguished Production. The show received nine Outer Critics Circle Award nominations, winning three, including Outstanding New Broadway Musical, Outstanding New Score and Outstanding Actor in a Musical (Porter). The musical received only two Drama Desk Award nominations, however, and only one win: Porter for Outstanding Actor in a Musical.

Kinky Boots received a season-high 13 Tony Award nominations. Matilda, which The New York Times described as the "unalloyed critical hit" of the season, received 12 nominations, 11 of them in the same categories as Kinky Boots. In addition to its critical success, Matilda had won the Drama Desk Award for outstanding musical and had set a record by winning the most Olivier Awards in history. Nevertheless, Kinky Boots won a season-high six Tonys, including Best Musical, which the press described as an upset, and Lauper's win for Best Score made her the first woman to win alone in that category. The creative team are Americans, and reviewer David Cote, an American writing in The Guardian, judged that the show's win was a case of "the balance of love going to a homegrown American musical, Kinky Boots, over the British import Matilda." Kinky Boots also won the 2013 Artios Award for Outstanding Achievement in Casting in the Broadway musical category.

Kinky Boots won the award for Best Musical Theater Album at the Grammy Awards in January 2014.

Awards and nominations

Original Broadway production

Original West End Production

Original Australian production

Notes

External links 
 
 
  (archive)
 Kinky Boots at Tony Awards.com

Kinky Boots (musical)